Jeonbuk Hyundai Motors is a South Korean professional football club based in Jeonju, North Jeolla Province that competes in the K League 1, the top tier of South Korean football. Playing at the Jeonju World Cup Stadium, Jeonbuk have won the K League a record nine times, including five consecutive titles between 2017 and 2021, and the Korean FA Cup five times. The club have also won the AFC Champions League twice, the first time in 2006, becoming the first club from East Asia to win the tournament since it was launched in its current format in 2003, as well as for a time being the only team in the world to have become continental champions without ever having won a domestic league title. This title guaranteed their participation at the FIFA Club World Cup in December 2006.

History
Jeonbuk Hyundai Motors' predecessors were founded in January 1993 as the Wansan Pumas. Oh Hyung-keun was the founder of the team, the first to be named after their home location in the history of the K League.

However, they were not able to raise enough funds and Wansan Puma FC went into bankruptcy before they could take their place in the K-League. Many people were eager to keep their club and Bobae Ltd., a local alcohol manufacturer, offered financial support to the club. The club joined the K-League in 1994 after changing its name to Chonbuk Buffalo. The team ran into financial problems and was dissolved after the final match in the 1994 season. In 1994, South Korea was under a bid campaign to host the 2002 FIFA World Cup, so Hyundai Motors took over the Buffaloes' players and launched a new club called Jeonbuk Dinos on 12 December 1994.

K-League officially stated that Chonbuk Buffalo and Jeonbuk Hyundai Motors are different clubs. Therefore, Jeonbuk Hyundai Motors' history and statistics and records are from 12 December 1994.

Since 1994, Jeonbuk had not seriously challenged for the Korean League title, often languishing in mid-table. After Choi Gang-hee was appointed manager in July 2005, Jeonbuk won the Korean FA Cup in December of that year. In 2006, Jeonbuk finished a disappointing eleventh in the Korean League, however the season had a surprising ending, as Jeonbuk won their first AFC Champions League final in Homs, Syria. En route to the final they defeated the champions of Japan, Gamba Osaka, and Chinese side Shanghai Shenhua, and they also beat Ulsan Horang-i, the champion of Korea, in the semi-finals. They triumphed 3–2 on aggregate over Al-Karamah, the champion of Syria, in the final.

They had an opportunity to join the FIFA Club World Cup in December 2006 as AFC Champions League winners. They lost their first game 1–0 to América in the quarter-finals on 10 December, however, they defeated Auckland City 3–0 on 14 December and finished fifth in the tournament. In 2009, Jeonbuk became the champion of K-League by beating Seongnam Ilhwa 3–1 on aggregate in the K-League Championship on 6 December 2009.

On 22 October 2011, Jeonbuk claimed their first-place spot in the K-League for the second time in their history. Furthermore, they reached the final of the AFC Champions League, where they lost to Al-Sadd after a penalty-shootout. On 4 December 2011, Jeonbuk confirmed the K-League title with a 4–2 aggregate victory in the play-off final against Ulsan Hyundai.

On 26 November 2016, Jeonbuk won their second AFC Champions League title after defeating Al Ain FC 3–2 on aggregate.

Squad

Current squad
As of 18 March 2023

Squad number 12 is reserved for the team's supporters, the Mad Green Boys.

Out on loan

Honours

Domestic

League
 K League 1

Winners (9): 2009, 2011, 2014, 2015, 2017, 2018, 2019, 2020, 2021
Runners-up (3): 2012, 2016, 2022

Cups
 Korean FA Cup
Winners (5): 2000, 2003, 2005, 2020, 2022
Runners-up (2): 1999, 2013
Korean League Cup
Runners-up (1): 2010
Korean Super Cup
Winners (1): 2004
Runners-up (2): 2001, 2006
 Korean President's Cup
Runners-up (1): 1999

International
AFC Champions League
Winners (2): 2006, 2016
 Runners-up (1): 2011
Asian Cup Winners' Cup
Runners-up (1): 2002

Backroom staff

Coaching staff
Head coach:  Kim Sang-sik
Coach:  Kim Do-heon,  Ahn Jae-suk,  Park Won-jae
Goalkeeping coach:  Lee Woon-jae
Technical advisor:  Roberto Di Matteo
Director of youth academy (U-18):  Ahn Dae-hyeon

Source: Official website

Support staff
Club doctor:  Song Ha-heon
Physiotherapist   Gilvan Oliveira
Assistant club doctor:  Lee Hyun-ju
Assistant club doctor:  Lee Hyuk-jun
Interpreter:  Kim Min-soo

Source: Official website

Managers

Season-by-season records

Key
Tms. = Number of teams
Pos. = Position in league

AFC Champions League record
All results list Jeonbuk's goal tally first.

See also
Hyundai Motor Company
List of football clubs in South Korea

References

External links

 Official website 

 
Association football clubs established in 1994
K League 1 clubs
Sport in North Jeolla Province
Hyundai Motor Company
Sport in Jeonju
1994 establishments in South Korea
Works association football clubs in South Korea
AFC Champions League winning clubs